The 2016 IMSA WeatherTech SportsCar Championship was the third season of the United SportsCar Championship and first to be under the name as the WeatherTech SportsCar Championship organized by the International Motor Sports Association (IMSA). It was the 46th season of IMSA-sanctioned GT Championship sportscar racing tracing its lineage to the 1971 IMSA Camel GT season. It began on January 30 with the 24 Hours of Daytona. and ended on October 1 at Petit Le Mans.

Classes
The class structure remained largely unchanged from 2015, with the major change coming in GTD which will now run full GT3 spec machinery.

Prototype (P)
Prototype Challenge (PC)
GT Le Mans (GTLM)
GT Daytona (GTD)

Schedule

Race schedule

The 2016 schedule was released on August 8, 2015 and features twelve rounds.

There were also two test sessions before the beginning of the season. They were held on November 17-18 at Daytona International Speedway, as well as The Roar Before the 24, also at Daytona, January 8-10.

NOTE:  Because of a high car count for the Mazda Raceway event, there will be two separate two-hour races with two categories racing in each race.

Calendar changes

PC has been added to the lineup at Long Beach.
GTD has been added to the lineup at the Mobil 1 SportsCar Grand Prix, having the race feature all four classes.
The round at Mazda Raceway Laguna Seca will return to a split race format because of field size.
GTLM will join PC and GTD at Lime Rock Park.

Entries

Prototype

Prototype Challenge
All entries use an Oreca FLM09 chassis powered by a Chevrolet LS3 6.2 L V8.

GT Le Mans

GT Daytona

Team changes
After 8 years sported the higher E85 Ethanol blend, Corvette Racing officially switched to traditional E20 Ethanol 20% blend as it was announced on October 13, 2015.

Race results
Bold indicates overall winner.

Championship standings

Points systems

Championship points are awarded in each class at the finish of each event. Points are awarded based on finishing positions as shown in the chart below.

Drivers points

Points are awarded in each class at the finish of each event. Drivers must complete a minimum driving time (outlined to teams prior to each event) in order to score points.  A driver does not score points if the minimum drive time is not met.

In addition, for each car credited with a race start, each driver nominated in that car also receives one additional “starting point.”

Team points

Team points are calculated in exactly the same way as driver points, using the point distribution chart and “starting points.” Each car entered is considered its own “team” regardless if it is a single entry or part of a two-car team.

Manufacturer points
There are also a number of manufacturer championships which utilize the same season-long point distribution chart, minus the “starting points” used for the driver and team championships. (The “starting point” is not used in manufacturer championship points.) The manufacturer championships recognized by IMSA are as follows:

Prototype (P): Engine Manufacturer
GT Le Mans (GTLM): Car Manufacturer
GT Daytona (GTD): Car Manufacturer

Each manufacturer receives finishing points for its highest finishing car in each class. The positions of subsequent finishing cars from the same manufacturer are not taken into consideration, and all other manufacturers move up in the order.

Example: Manufacturer A finishes 1st and 2nd at an event, and Manufacturer B finishes 3rd. Manufacturer A receives 35 first-place points while Manufacturer B would earn 32 second-place points.

The points system for the 2016 season is the same as in 2015.

North American Endurance Cup
The points system for the North American Endurance Cup is different from the normal points system. Points are awarded on a 5-4-3-2 basis for drivers, teams and manufacturers. The first finishing position at each interval earns five points, four points for second position, three points for third, with two points awarded for fourth and each subsequent finishing position.

At Daytona (24 hour race), points are awarded at six hours, 12 hours, 18 hours and at the finish. At the Sebring (12 hour race), points are awarded at four hours, eight hours and at the finish.  At Watkins Glen (6 hour race), points are awarded at three hours and at the finish.  At Road Atlanta (10 hour race), points are awarded at four hours, eight hours and at the finish.

Like the season-long team championship, North American Endurance Cup team points are awarded for each car and drivers get points in any car that they drive, in which they are entered for points.  The manufacturer points go to the highest placed car from that manufacturer (the others from that manufacturer not being counted), just like the season-long manufacturer championship.

For example: in any particular segment manufacturer A finishes 1st and 2nd and manufacturer B finishes 3rd. Manufacturer A only receives first-place points for that segment. Manufacturer B receives the second-place points.

Drivers' championships

Prototype

Notes
Drivers denoted by † did not complete sufficient laps in order to score points.

Prototype Challenge

Notes
1 – Jack Hawksworth did not drive any laps during the race and therefore did not receive the one "starting point".
Drivers denoted by † did not complete sufficient laps in order to score points.

GT Le Mans

GT Daytona

Notes
1 – All drivers using Lamborghini Huracán GT3-cars were penalized with five minutes added to their total time due to BoP-regulations.
2 – Bret Curtis, Ashley Freiberg, Jens Klingmann and Marco Wittmann were put to the back of their class for exceeding the maximum drive-time limitation.
3 – Andy Lally, John Potter and Marco Seefried were put to second to last in their class for a minimum drive-time violation.
4 – Jörg Bergmeister, Patrick Lindsey and Matt McMurry were put to last in their class for a minimum drive-time violation.
Drivers denoted by † did not complete sufficient laps in order to score points.

Teams' championships

Prototype

Prototype Challenge

GT Le Mans

GT Daytona

Notes
1 – All teams using Lamborghini Huracán GT3-cars were penalized with five minutes added to their total time due to BoP-regulations.
2 – Car No. 96 of Turner Motorsport was put to the back of its class for exceeding the maximum drive-time limitation.
3 – Car No. 44 of Magnus Racing was put to second to last in its class for a minimum drive-time violation.
4 – Car No. 73 of Park Place Motorsports was put to last in its class for a minimum drive-time violation.

Manufacturers' championships

Prototype

GT Le Mans

GT Daytona

Notes
1 – Lamborghini was unable to score at Daytona as they were penalized due to BoP-regulations.

Notes

References

External links
 

WeatherTech SportsCar Championship seasons
WeatherTech SportsCar Championship